Ragnar Alexander Stare (24 November 1884 – 30 June 1964) was a Swedish sport shooter who competed in the 1920 Summer Olympics. In 1920 he won the silver medal as member of the Swedish team in the team small-bore rifle competition. He also participated in the individual small-bore rifle event but his exact place is unknown.

References

External links
profile

1884 births
1964 deaths
Swedish male sport shooters
ISSF rifle shooters
Olympic shooters of Sweden
Shooters at the 1920 Summer Olympics
Olympic silver medalists for Sweden
Olympic medalists in shooting
Medalists at the 1920 Summer Olympics
Sportspeople from Gotland County
19th-century Swedish people
20th-century Swedish people